The European route E22 in Sweden goes between Trelleborg and Norrköping and is a part of the European route E22. The Swedish E22 has mixed standard, varying between motorway (motorväg), two-lane expressway (motortrafikled), 2+1 road (mötesfri motortrafikled) and a fairly wide ordinary road. It is generally built from around 1950 until today and more is under construction and even more is planned. Sweden's first motorway Malmö-Lund (from 1953) is included in E22 as well as motorways opened in 2014.

Junctions

European routes in Sweden
Motorways in Sweden
Transport in Skåne County
Transport in Blekinge County
Transport in Kalmar County
Transport in Östergötland County